Unión Supe is a Peruvian football club, from the city of Supe, Barranca, Lima. It was founded in 1954 and currently plays in the Copa Perú.

History
In the 2008 Copa Perú, the club classified to the National Stage, but was eliminated by Colegio Nacional de Iquitos in the quarterfinals.

In the 2009 Copa Perú, the club was eliminated in the Departmental Stage by the Deportivo Independiente Miraflores of Miraflores in the quarterfinals.

Honours

Regional
Región IV:
Runner-up (1): 2008

Liga Departamental de Lima:
 Runner-up (2): 1996, 2008

Liga Provincial de Barranca:
Winners (3): 1985, 1996, 2022

Liga Distrital de Supe Pueblo:
Winners (5): 2008, 2010, 2017, 2019, 2022
 Runner-up (1): 2015

See also
List of football clubs in Peru
Peruvian football league system

External links
 facebook.com Club Union Supe

References

Football clubs in Peru
Association football clubs established in 1954